Skytrans is an Australian owned and operated airline and air charter business based in Cairns. The airline operates RPT (Regular Public Transport) and charter services from Cairns, Horn Island, and Brisbane. After being placed in administration in January 2015, Skytrans returned to the skies on 31 March 2015.

History
Skytrans was founded by David and Sue Barnard in October 1990 as a charter airline, and began scheduled flights in 1993. In November 2000, Skytrans merged with AirSwift Aviation, another small regional airline based in Cairns. In June 2001, Skytrans took over services to Cooktown and Karumba from MacAir Airlines. In January 2005, the airline began to operate in competition with QantasLink on the Cairns to Townsville route, operating from its own terminals in both cities.

In December 2006, the airline was acquired from its founders by Australian Aviation Holdings, owner of Queensland Regional Airlines (QRA) and Inland Pacific Air. Skytrans and QRA subsequently merged under the Skytrans Regional brand.

Late in 2014, the carrier had sought to reduce costs by cutting its workforce of 200 employees by over half while trimming its fleet of seven Dash 8-100s and three Dash 8-300s.

Skytrans suspended operations with effect from 2 January 2015 when placed in voluntary administration. In a statement, Managing Director Simon Wild blamed the worsening Australian dollar currency exchange rate, coupled with a tough operating environment – worsened by the loss of three Queensland regulated regional air routes in late 2014. The end of operations came a day after the carrier marked its 25th anniversary of Queensland services - outback and regional Queensland, the Gulf country, and Cape York services in particular on 2 January 2015.

On 31 March 2015, Skytrans returned to the skies under the ownership of Collings Holdings Airlines owned by Peter Collings, who also owns West Wing Aviation, and Rugby League player Johnathan Thurston.

Destinations
Skytrans operates RPT and charter flights throughout the Cape York and Torres Strait regions. Skytrans also provides charter flights out of Brisbane Airport for Queensland Gas Company (QGC).

Destinations served from Cairns Airport:

Kowanyama
Pormpuraaw
Townsville
Aurukun
Lockhart River
Horn Island
Proserpine 
Rockhampton

Destinations served from Horn Island Airport:

Cairns
Lockhart River
Kubin Village (Moa Island)
Badu Island
Mabuiag Island
Boigu Island
Saibai Island
Murray Island
Darnley Island
Yam Island
Coconut Island
Yorke Island
Warraber Island

Destinations served from Brisbane Airport:

Chinchilla
Taroom

Fleet

As of June 2018, the Skytrans fleet consisted of four de Havilland Canada Dash 8-100 (as of August 2019) and six Cessna 208 Caravans.

Sponsorships
Skytrans has delivered multimillion-dollar sponsorships and endorsements to communities in Queensland, donating to more than 250 organisations. Skytrans is a major sponsor of the Cairns Taipans in the National Basketball League and has supported various causes such as AFL Kickstart, Choice Business Australia, The Queensland Cancer Council, and Harold's House.

See also
List of airlines of Australia

References

External links

Company website

Airlines established in 1990
Regional Aviation Association of Australia
Australian companies established in 1990
Companies based in Queensland